Márcio de Oliveira (27 November 1912 – 22 March 1978) was a Brazilian athlete. He competed in the men's long jump at the 1936 Summer Olympics.

References

External links

1912 births
1978 deaths
Athletes (track and field) at the 1936 Summer Olympics
Brazilian male long jumpers
Olympic athletes of Brazil